The Epic LT is an American kit-built single-engined turboprop aircraft intended for use by private pilots. The Epic Dynasty was the proposed certified version of the LT that was intended be sold as a completed aircraft, prior to Epic Aircraft's bankruptcy in August 2009 and later acquisition by new owners in April 2010. Under ownership of the reorganized company, the certificated version is to be called the E1000, with first deliveries initially scheduled for 2015, but delayed until 2019.

Development

The LT was designed by Epic Air LLC of Bend, Oregon, to meet demand for a kit-built high-performance single turboprop-engined six-seat private owner aircraft. It has a low-wing layout with the tailplanes mid-set on a single fin. The tricycle undercarriage is fully retractable. Its construction uses composites incorporating carbon fibres. The engine is a Pratt & Whitney PT6-67A turboprop flat rated to 1200 hp.

The prototype LT first flew in 2004.

The prototype Dynasty, Epic LT number 14, had logged over 1000 hours of certification flight testing by 23 October 2006, but certification was not complete in June 2009, with the company reporting over 2000 test hours flown.

Flight testing of the prototype, registered C-FJRQ, was initially commenced in Calgary, Alberta, Canada, but the aircraft was removed from the Canadian register on 2 March 2007. It was moved back to Bend, Oregon, and re-registered as N6XK.

Sales stopped in 2012, to be replaced by the certificated Epic E1000, and the 54th and final kit had secured its certificate of airworthiness in December 2018, before its early 2019 delivery to its owner.

It is the basis of the China Aviation Industry General Aircraft Primus 150.

Operational history

Deliveries of LT kits commenced in 2006 with the first one completed that year and the aircraft was demonstrated at the EAA show at Oshkosh, Wisconsin, in July 2007.

Initially, the LT aircraft kits were completed by amateur builders under factory supervision in the factory at Bend but some later examples have been assembled at field locations, with assistance from Epic Aircraft.

On 7 July 2016, six Epic LT kit-built aircraft departed on a global circumnavigation flight, flown by owner-pilots. They departed from the AirVenture 2016 airshow, in Oshkosh, Wisconsin.

Variants

Epic LT
Experimental homebuilt version
Epic E1000
Certified version planned for production in 2019 at a unit cost of $3.25 million
CAIGA Primus 150
CAIGA International version

Accidents and incidents
A total of two Epic LT accidents have been reported by the US National Transportation Safety Board.

On 31 March 2019, an Epic LT, registration RA-2151G, crashed in a field on approach to Frankfurt Egelsbach Airport in southwestern Germany at about 3:30 p.m. Russian S7 Airlines co-owner Natalia Fileva, one of Russia’s richest women, her father and the pilot died in the crash.

Specifications (LT/Dynasty)

See also 
Extra EA-500
Kestrel K-350
Pilatus PC-12
Piper Meridian
SOCATA TBM 900

References

External links

 
 
 
 

Dynasty
2000s United States civil utility aircraft
Single-engined tractor aircraft
Single-engined turboprop aircraft
Low-wing aircraft
Aircraft first flown in 2004